The 2022 Internazionali di Tennis Città di Perugia was a professional tennis tournament played on clay courts. It was the seventh edition of the tournament which was part of the 2022 ATP Challenger Tour. It took place in Perugia, Italy between 6 and 12 June 2022.

Singles main-draw entrants

Seeds

 1 Rankings are as of 23 May 2022.

Other entrants
The following players received wildcards into the singles main draw:
  Matteo Arnaldi
  Matteo Gigante
  Luca Potenza

The following player received entry into the singles main draw as a special exempt:
  Francesco Passaro

The following players received entry into the singles main draw as alternates:
  Borna Ćorić
  Nerman Fatić

The following players received entry from the qualifying draw:
  Elliot Benchetrit
  Luciano Darderi
  Maximilian Marterer
  Giovanni Oradini
  Cristian Rodríguez
  Giorgio Tabacco

The following player received entry as a lucky loser:
  Filippo Baldi

Champions

Singles

  Jaume Munar def.  Tomás Martín Etcheverry 6–3, 4–6, 6–1.

Doubles

  Sadio Doumbia /  Fabien Reboul def.  Marco Bortolotti /  Sergio Martos Gornés 6–2, 6–4.

References

Internazionali di Tennis Città di Perugia
2022
2022 in Italian tennis
June 2022 sports events in Italy